The Church of England Parish of St Augustine of Hippo, Grimsby came into being on 14 May 1912. It was formed by taking 85 acres from the Parish of St Mary & St James, Grimsby and 255 acres from the Parish of the Holy Trinity and St Mary, Old Clee. As part of the land of the Parish had belonged to the Augustinian Canons of Wellow Abbey, it was appropriate that it should be placed under the patronage of St Augustine of Hippo. The new church had been dedicated in November 1911 but was consecrated on 28 March 1912. The Vicar of Grimsby is the patron of the living and Canon A.A. Markham appointed Fr Frank Bloomer the first vicar of the new parish. He came to Grimsby from Barton upon Humber and remained here until his death in 1938. His cremated remains are interred in the Lady Chapel. During his incumbency nine priests served as assistant curates.

St Augustine's is a truly beautiful church, designed by Sir Charles Nicholson. Henry Thorold describes the fine interior with its numerous altars, statues and lamps as "the kind of church that compels people to their knees". From its inception, the style and ethos reflects the Anglican Catholic tradition. The exterior of the church is also pleasing to the eye, with Virginia Creeper covering its walls and a well-kept and imaginative garden surrounding it. The north aisle, also to a design by  Nicholson, was added in 1935. The church has been designated a grade II listed building.

An altar set was presented as a memorial to James Paul Moody, 6th Officer on the Titanic.

The organ is an instrument by the noted Hull manufacturer of Forster and Andrews and though small in size is a worthy instrument. It was restored and new stops were added in 2010. It is used with regularity throughout the year both for services and also for recitals and concerts

References

External links
 Parish Website
 Entry on A Church near you.com

.

Diocese of Lincoln
Anglo-Catholic church buildings in Lincolnshire
Church of England church buildings in Lincolnshire
Churches in Grimsby
Grimsby